MPEG-1 Audio Layer I, commonly abbreviated to MP1, is one of three audio formats included in the MPEG-1 standard. It is a deliberately simplified version of MPEG-1 Audio Layer II (MP2), created for applications where lower compression efficiency could be tolerated in return for a less complex algorithm that could be executed with simpler hardware requirements. While supported by most media players, the codec is considered largely obsolete, and replaced by MP2 or MP3.

For files only containing MP1 audio, the file extension .mp1 is used.

A limited version of MPEG-1 layer I was also used by the Digital Compact Cassette format, in the form of the PASC (Precision Adaptive Subband Coding) audio compression codec. The bit rate of PASC was fixed at 384 kilobits per second, and when encoding audio at a sample frequency of 44.1 kHz, PASC regards the padding slots as 'dummy' and sets them to zero, whereas the ISO/IEC 11172-3 standard uses them to store data.

Specification
MPEG-1 Layer I is defined in ISO/IEC 11172-3, which first version was published in 1993.
 Sampling rates: 32, 44.1 and 48 kHz
 Bitrates: 32, 64, 96, 128, 160, 192, 224, 256, 288, 320, 352, 384, 416 and 448 kbit/s

An extension has been provided in MPEG-2 Layer I and is defined in ISO/IEC 13818-3, which first version was published in 1995.
 Additional sampling rates: 16, 22.05 and 24 kHz
 Additional bitrates: 48, 56, 80, 112, 144 and 176 kbit/s

MP1 uses a comparatively simple sub-band coding, using 32 sub-bands.

Licensing 
Sisvel S.p.A., a Luxembourg-based company, administers licenses for patents applying to MPEG Audio. As MPEG-1 is well over 20 years old, all MPEG-1 patents have expired, therefore open source encoders and decoders can be distributed without paying licensing fees.

References

External links 
 
 Sub-Band Coding:  A description of sub-band coding, including an overview of the MP1 codec.

Audio file formats
Film and video technology
MPEG